Hans Senger (25 May 1925 – 11 May 2004) was an Austrian alpine skier. He competed in two events at the 1952 Winter Olympics.

References

1925 births
2004 deaths
Austrian male alpine skiers
Olympic alpine skiers of Austria
Alpine skiers at the 1952 Winter Olympics
Sportspeople from Salzburg (state)
People from St. Johann im Pongau District